Mujeres y toros ("Women and Bulls") is a 1939 Mexican film. It stars Carlos Orellana.

External links
 

1939 films
1930s Spanish-language films
Mexican black-and-white films
Mexican drama films
1939 drama films
1930s Mexican films